Beijing Chen Jing Lun High School (abbreviated as BJCJL), is one of the oldest high schools in Chaoyang District of Beijing, and one of the first beacon high schools of the city.  Founded in 1921 by Japanese philanthropist Yasuzo Shimizu in the impoverished neighborhood outside Chaoyangmen as a school for disadvantaged girls, the school has undergone a series changes from the original Chongzhen School (崇祯学园), to the No. 4 High School for Girls (女子第四中学) in 1945, to the coeducational Chaoyang High School (朝阳中学) during the Cultural Revolution and finally to Chen Jing Lun High School in 1991, after the Hong Kong entrepreneur and philanthropist Chan King-Luen (陈经纶, 陳經綸, Chen Jinglun in Mandarin).  Today, it is one of the most well-regarded high schools in the city's Central Business District.

History

1921–1945: Chongzhen School for Girls 
Chen Jing Lun High School's institutional predecessor was the Chongzhen School (崇祯学园), founded in 1921 by the philanthropist and United Japanese Christian missionary, Yasuzo Shimizu.  Shimizu, who later founded the Oberlin University in Tokyo, witnessed the poverty in Beijing (then known in English as Peking) and decided to open a school for disadvantaged girls in the poor neighborhood outside Chaoyangmen.  On May 28, 1921, the Chongzhen School opened at No. 8 Pailou Hutong, in two converted residences.  The school had two sections – the Chongzhen Workstudy School for Girls and the Chongzhen Middle School for Girls.  The Workstudy School was headed by Wang Tingliang, Luo Junying and Mihoko Shimizu, Yasuzo Shimizu's first wife, who died in 1933.  The school recruited only women, who took classes and worked at the same time.  The Chongzhen Middle School for Girls was headed by Yasuzo Shimizu, Ikuko Shimizu, who became his second wife, and Zhao Huizhen.  On October 17, 1936, the school moved to its current campus in Fangcaodi.  The school featured bilingual education in Chinese and Japanese and promoted gender equality and social responsibility.

1945–1976: No. 4 High School for Girls 
After the end of World War II, the Chongzhen School was converted into a public school and renamed the Beiping No. 4 School for Girls on November 8, 1945.   In 1947, a high school section was added.  In March 1949, after the Chinese Communists captured the city and renamed it Beijing, the school became the Beijing No. 4 High School for Girls and remained an all girls' school.  The school's party secretary and then principal was Pan Ji, a student of Shimizu Yasuzō's at Chongzhen who joined the Chinese Communist revolution.  In 1954, the Beijing Education Bureau designated the school a key point school of the city.  The school was designated a friendship school of the Albanian Embassy in Beijing.  Model worker Wu Yunduo, also known as "the Pavel Korchagin of China" visited the school and a model "Pavel class" was designated at the school.

In 1966, the Cultural Revolution brought turmoil to the school as students and teachers, under the encouragement of Chairman Mao Zedong, rebelled against school authorities and formed Red Guard groups. In August 1966, two teachers were beaten to death by Red Guards. Another instructor committed suicide.  Principal Pan Ji was purged and nearly beaten to death.  A group of radical female Red Guard students from the school were notorious for shaving their heads and wielding leather belts.

1976–1991: Chaoyang High School 
At the end of the Cultural Revolution in 1976, the Beijing Female No.4 High School was renamed Chaoyang High School and converted into a coeducational institution.

1991–present: Chen Jing Lun High School 
Hong Kong entrepreneur Chan King-Luen donated RMB 20 million to Chaoyang High School in 1991 for the renovation of the old campus. Thereafter the school was renamed Beijing Chen Jing Lun High School, using his Mandarin name, by the Beijing municipal government.
In July 2011, the Chen Jing Lun School and the Mount Lawley Senior High School became partners in the Australia-China BRIDGE School Partnerships Project. In April 2013, Australian Prime Minister Julia Gillard visited the Chen Jing Lun High School.

Campus 

With its Spanish style architecture, the school contains a laboratory building, an auditorium, a dormitory and four teaching buildings, running from A1 to A4.

The playground consists of an official sized football pitch, several basketball courts and a regularly sized 400m running track. There is also an Olympic sized swimming pool in the auditorium building. However, the playground and the track are dilapidated and require a major overhaul.

Facilities 
Beijing Chen Jing Lun High School's facilities include:

  Astronomy dome with telescope.
  Indoor swimming pool.
  Library with more than nine million books.
   indoor basketball court.
  Lecture hall with capacity for 200.
  Auditorium with capacity for 2,000.
  School cafeteria with capacity for 1,000.
  Multi-function reading room.
   running track.
  Two computer science classrooms, each equipped with 40 PCs.
  Nine biology, chemistry and physics laboratories.
  46 classrooms, each with a PC and projector, all with Internet access

Related schools 

In June 1998, many of the best key high schools in Beijing had their junior (grades 7–9) and senior (grades 10–12) divisions separated, resulting two independent entities. The high school division has continued to use the original school name and campus, and the junior divisions were renamed the Branch Schools of the original schools and were often relocated to satellite campuses. The junior high school division of Chen Jing Lun was separated from the high school division that year, becoming the Branch of Chen Jinglun Middle School (陈经纶中学分校), and its new campus has been at Wangjing The entering class of 1998 (Class of 2001) completed their first year study (junior 1/grade 7) at the original downtown campus, and moved to the Wangjing campus when its construction was completed in August 1999.  The Wangjing branch school is considered one of the best junior high schools in Beijing, much exceeding the reputation of its mother school. The school has since opened two other branch schools: the Jiaming Branch School (嘉铭分校) and the Dijing Branch School (帝景分校).
The Beijing Chen Jing Lun High School (BJCJL) is often compared with Beijing No.80 Middle School, and Chaoyang Foreign Language High School.

Alumni 
Lang Ping (朗平) (Jenny Lang), former Chinese volleyball player and former head coach of the Chinese and U.S. women's national volleyball teams.
Li Huifen (李慧芬)  Vice-chairman of China Administration of Quality (CAQ, 中国质量管理协会)

See also 
Beacon high schools in Beijing
Beijing No.80 Middle School

References

External links

 Official website

Educational institutions established in 1921
High schools in Beijing
1921 establishments in China
Schools in Chaoyang District, Beijing